The Mead–Van Duyne House is a historic stone house that was originally located at 636 Fairfield Road in the Mountain View section of the township of Wayne in Passaic County, New Jersey. The oldest section of the house dates to 1706. It is the second oldest surviving Dutch stone house in the county. It was documented by the Historic American Buildings Survey in 1938.  Listed as the William Klein property, it was added to the National Register of Historic Places on August 12, 1971, for its significance in architecture, military history, and religion/philosophy. In 1974, the building was relocated to 543 Berdan Avenue, next to the Van Riper–Hopper House, as part of the Wayne Museum. It was renominated as the Van Duyne House in 1976. It was relisted on the state register on March 15, 1976. The property was withdrawn from the NRHP on December 15, 1976.

See also
 National Register of Historic Places listings in Passaic County, New Jersey
 List of the oldest buildings in New Jersey
 List of museums in New Jersey

References

External links
 
 

	
Wayne, New Jersey
Houses in Passaic County, New Jersey
Stone houses in New Jersey
National Register of Historic Places in Passaic County, New Jersey
New Jersey Register of Historic Places
Historic American Buildings Survey in New Jersey
1706 establishments in New Jersey
Houses completed in 1706
Museums in Passaic County, New Jersey
Historic house museums in New Jersey